Lohja is a city and municipality in the Uusimaa region of Finland. The municipality is bilingual, with the majority being Finnish and minority Swedish speakers. Lohja has the fourth-most summer houses of any municipality in Finland, with 8,468 located within the city as of June 2018. Lohja is located near Greater Helsinki, and it benefits from a good road network. It takes less than an hour to drive from Helsinki to Lohja on the E18 motorway, which is one of the most significant main road connections in Lohja next to Hangonväylä.

City's bilingual slogan is: Järvikaupunki - Insjöstaden which translates to "Lake city".

The landscape of Lohja is characterized by manors and gardens. Its area is divided by the Lohja ridge, which forms a watershed for the largest lake system in Uusimaa, Lake Lohja (Lohjanjärvi); mostly that's why Lohja is also referred to as "Lake City" (järvikaupunki). The medieval Church of St. Lawrence is the architectural highlight of downtown Lohja, which also includes a heterogeneous mix of buildings mostly dating from the 1960s onwards. The Lohja library, which was opened in 2005, is a distinctly modern building 

Lohja has been a focal point for the population and economy of western Uusimaa since the early 14th century.  The local inhabitants were among the pioneers of the Finnish mining and construction material industries. Lohja has long-established traditions in horticulture and especially in market gardening. These traditions are represented by the 

During the Second World War, the Soviet Union heavily bombed the city,

Politics

Local 
Mika Sivula is the city manager of Lohja. The city manager oversees the city committee. In addition to the city committee, Lohja has a 51-seat municipal council. The parties represented in the council as well as their seat counts are listed below.

National

2015 parliamentary election

Culture
  The most notable are the Lohja Summer Cultural Festival, the Apple Carnival organized by representatives of business and commerce, the retailers' Hurlumhei Carnival and the Old Time Christmas market continue the tradition of fairs dating back to the Middle Ages.

The Doom Metal band Reverend Bizarre hails from Lohja.

Elias Lönnrot, who wrote the Kalevala, was both born and died in Sammatti, which has been part of Lohja since 2009.

Sights

One unique experience is the Tytyri limestone mine, which has a museum located 100 metres under ground. This attraction and exhibitions can be reached using either an old mine wagon or a modern lift. Other places of note are:

Lohja museum area
The surroundings of Lohjanjärvi
The gothic Church of St. Lawrence which dates from the 15th century
Kisakallio Sport college
Floating Restaurant-Café Kaljaasi
Alitalo vineyard
St. Lawrence Golf and the recreation bath Neidonkeidas

Sports 
Lohjan Pallo is the football team of the city. Lohja also has a ice hockey team called Lohjan Jääankat.

Municipal consolidations 

The municipality of Lohja was consolidated with the city of Lohja in 1997, and the municipality of Sammatti in 2009. The municipalities of Karjalohja and Nummi-Pusula were consolidated with Lohja in 2013.

Local subdivisions

A significant part of the city of Lohja is not yet part of any district, since after the 1997 municipal association with the former rural municipality of Lohja.

Neighborhoods
The official city districts within the city proper of the municipality of Lohja are:
 Ahtsalmi, Anttila, Gruotila, Gunnarla, Hiidensalmi, Immula, Keskilohja, Kirkniemi, Kukkumäki (formerly Luttula), Kirkonkylä, Lempola, Maksjoki, Metsola, Moisio, Muijala, Myllylampi, Neitsytlinna, Ojamo, Ojamonkangas, Paloniemi, Pappila, Pappilankorpi, Perttilä, Pitkäniemi, Routio, Röylä, Sammatti, Vappula, Ventelä, Vienola and Virkkala.

Villages
The villages and hamlets of the municipality of Lohja are:

Lohja rural
 Ahtiala, Askola, Hermala, Hietainen, Hiittinen, Hongisto, Iso-Teutari, Jalassaari, Jantoniemi, Kaijola, Karjalohjan Ahtiala, Karjalohjan Pappila, Karkalniemi, Karnainen, Kittilä, Koikkala, Kokkila, Korkenoja, Koski, Kouvola, Kunnarla, Kutsila, Laakspohja, Lehmijärvi, Lieviö, Lohjankylä, Lylyinen, Maksjoki, Mynterlä*, Niemi, Nummenkylä, Näätälä, Osuniemi, Outamo, Paavola, Paksalo, Pauni, Pietilä, Piispala, Pulli, Seräjärvi, Skraatila, Suittila, Särkijärvi, Talpela, Torhola, Vaanila, Valla, Vanhakylä, Varola, Vasarla, Veijola, Virkkala, Vohloinen, Vähä-Teutari and Yli-Immola.

Sammatti
 Haarijärvi (Haarjärvi), Karstu, Kaukola, Kiikala, Leikkilä, Lohilampi, Luskala, Myllykylä, Niemenkylä and Sammatti

Karjalohja
 Härjänvatsa, Ilmoniemi, Immola, Karkali, Kattelus, Kourjoki, Kuusia, Kärkelä, Lohjantaipale, Lönnhammar (Linhamari), Maila, Makkarjoki, Murto, Mustlahti, Nummijärvi, Pappila, Pellonkylä, Pipola, Pitkälahti (Långvik), Puujärvi, Pyöli, Saarenpää, Sakkola, Suurniemi, Särkjärvi, Tallaa and Tammisto

Nummi
 Haarla, Hakula, Heijala, Heimola, Huhti, Hyrsylä, Hyvelä, Immola, Jakova, Järvenpää, Jättölä, Korkianoja, Kovela, Leppäkorpi, Luttula, Maikkala, Maskila, Mettula, Miemola, Millola, Mommola, Mäntsälä, Nummi, Näkkilä, Oinola, Oittila, Pakkala, Pälölä, Raatti, Remala, Retlahti, Röhkölä, Salo, Saukkola, Sierla, Sitarla, Tavola, Varttila and Vivola

Pusula
 Ahonpää, Hattula, Hauhula, Herrala, Hirvijoki, Hyrkkölä, Hyönölä, Ikkala, Karisjärvi, Kaukela, Koisjärvi, Kärkölä, Marttila, Mäkkylä, Pusula, Radus, Seppälä, Suomela, Uusikylä, Viiala and Vörlö

Twin towns
Lohja is twinned with:

  Växjö, Sweden  
  Ringerike, Norway
  Aabenraa, Denmark  
  Skagaströnd, Iceland  
  Sátoraljaújhely, Hungary

See also

Districts of Lohja 
 Saukkola
 Virkkala

Neighbourhoding municipalities 
 Ingå
 Siuntio
 Vihti

References

External links

Town of Lohja – Official site

 
Cities and towns in Finland
Municipalities of Uusimaa
Populated places established in 1926
Populated lakeshore places in Finland